Kelvin Peter Wright (born 1952) was the ninth Anglican bishop of the Diocese of Dunedin in Dunedin, New Zealand.  Bishop Kelvin retired on Easter Monday 2017.

Wright was educated at St John's College, Auckland, the University of Canterbury, the University of Otago and the San Francisco Theological Seminary. He was ordained deacon in 1979, priest in 1980 and bishop on 27 February 2010. He served as curate at Merivale and as vicar of Waihao Downs, Hillcrest, Sumner Redcliffs and St John's Roslyn.

References

1952 births
Living people
21st-century Anglican bishops in New Zealand
Anglican bishops of Dunedin